Avilov is the name of several rural localities in Russia:
Avilov, Konstantinovsky District, Rostov Oblast, a khutor in Avilovskoye Rural Settlement of Konstantinovsky District in Rostov Oblast
Avilov, Rodionovo-Nesvetaysky District, Rostov Oblast, a khutor in Rodionovo-Nesvetayskoye Rural Settlement of Rodionovo-Nesvetaysky District in Rostov Oblast
Avilov, Volgograd Oblast, a khutor in Avilovsky Selsoviet of Ilovlinsky District in Volgograd Oblast